"Hot" is a song by American rapper Young Thug, featuring vocals from labelmate and fellow American rapper Gunna. It was produced by Wheezy and sent to rhythmic and Urban radio on September 23, 2019. It originally charted in several countries as an album track upon the release of So Much Fun in August 2019, before being released in a remix with an additional feature from American rapper Travis Scott, a frequent collaborator of both, on October 31, 2019, and reaching a new peak of number 11 on the US Billboard Hot 100.

Music video
The music video for the remix was released through Young Thug's official YouTube channel one day later, on November 1, 2019. In the video, Young Thug appears as a fireman, and Gunna is shown rapping in a burning house.

Synopsis
The video opens with a marching band led by Wheezy, the song's producer, on a gridiron football field.  The video then transitions to Young Thug receiving a call help Gunna as he is on fire inside a house. Young Thug puts on his fireman gear and drives a Slime F.D. truck to the scene, and finds Gunna "calmly writing a note like nothing is happening around him". As soon as Thug approaches Gunna, the house explodes from the blaze. The scene then cuts to Travis Scott on a gridiron field, where the fire has now reached. Scott is surrounded by a marching band playing the song's instrumental. The blaze eventually hits each of the marching band members, who are lined up to spell out "Hot" like the track's cover art.

Personnel
 Young Thug – lead vocals, writing
 Gunna – featured vocals, writing
 Wheezy – production

Charts

Weekly charts

Year-end charts

Certifications

References

2019 singles
2019 songs
Gunna (rapper) songs
Young Thug songs
Travis Scott songs
Songs written by Gunna (rapper)
Songs written by Young Thug
Songs written by Travis Scott
Songs written by Wheezy (record producer)
Song recordings produced by Wheezy (record producer)
Atlantic Records singles
Trap music songs